Halcyon Days Ltd is a British business which holds all three Royal Warrants to the British Royal Household as Suppliers of objets d'art – one of only 14 businesses to hold all three.

Specialists in English-made luxury goods, the business has two factories; one for enamelware in Wolverhampton and the other for English fine bone china in the heart of the pottery industry, Stoke-on-Trent.

The company operates its primary retail store within The Royal Exchange in London and its head office and showroom in London's Knightsbridge.

History 

Established in 1950 as an emporium of antique gifts in Mayfair, London, specialising in 17th and 18th century-style enamelware made in the Midlands, Halcyon Days is one of only fourteen companies in the world to hold all three Royal Warrants to the British Royal Household.

Over the years, the business has collaborated with The Wallace Collection, The National Gallery, Blenheim Palace, Smithsonian Institution, The Frick, International Churchill Society, Harrods, Fortnum & Mason, Nina Campbell, British Museum, Oxford Philharmonic Orchestra, Tate Gallery, and the artist Ralph Heimans.

Presently the company holds licenses with Historic Royal Palaces, Gordon Castle, and the Castle of Mey.

References 

Ceramics manufacturers of England
Companies based in Stoke-on-Trent
Retail companies based in London
Retail companies established in 1950
1950 establishments in England
British Royal Warrant holders
British companies established in 1950
British enamellers